Martin and Lewis is a 2002 American made-for-television biographical film written and directed by John Gray, exploring the lives of the comedy team of Martin and Lewis. The film stars Jeremy Northam as Dean Martin and Sean Hayes as Jerry Lewis.

Plot
When lounge singer Dean Martin (Northam) and burlesque comic Jerry Lewis (Hayes) clicked during an impromptu pairing in 1946, neither anticipated their unparalleled success as a team. Lewis was going nowhere fast with an act built around miming to records, while Martin was making a subpar living as a crooner, sleeping on his agent's couch. Lewis had beseeched his agent to reteam him with the reluctant Martin; Lewis instigated their act and adopted the jaded pro as his unofficial big brother. Ever aloof, Martin is content to cash in on the bonanza and continue his sideline in womanizing. But as Lewis assumes more control, Martin’s mistress, Jeanne (Levering), nags him to take more credit. From bistros to radio to television, the seductive singer and the wacky stooge click with audiences. As the act takes Hollywood by storm in 1949, Lewis becomes paranoid about Martin’s popularity; psychosomatic stomach pains become his way of grabbing attention. Handsome and effortlessly charming, Martin successfully launches a solo acting career, in part to escape Lewis’s directorial aspirations and oppressive neediness. When Martin is called on the carpet by his wife, Betty (Cale), he walks out on his family; his frustration and resentment at being part of a two-headed showbiz monster only increases. Engineered by managers and agents, the last lap of the Martin-Lewis partnership is a cheerless financial arrangement, and though each triumphs after the official split in 1956, neither ever recaptures the elation of their early chemistry.

Cast
 Sean Hayes as Jerry Lewis
 Jeremy Northam as Dean Martin
 Paula Cale as Betty Martin
 Sarah Manninen as Patti Lewis
 Kate Levering as Jeanne Martin
 Scott McCord as Abby Greshler

Also featured in supporting roles are Steve Brinder as Danny Lewis, Conrad Dunn as Lou Perry, Bill Lake as Hal Wallis, David Eisner as Lew Wasserman, Robert Morelli as Skinny D'Amato and Markus Parilo as Irwin Woolfe. Sean Cullen makes an appearance in the film as comedian Jackie Gleason, who appears as an audience member at the duo's final performance at the Copacabana nightclub.

Production

Writing
In real life, Dean Martin was married to Jeanne Biegger in 1949, many years before the breakup of his professional partnership with Jerry Lewis.

The film is based on the book, Everybody Loves Somebody Sometime (Especially Himself): The Story of Dean Martin and Jerry Lewis by Arthur Marx.

Reception

Awards
 Art Directors Guild Excellence in Production Design Award – Television Movie or Mini-Series (nominated)
 Broadcast Film Critics Association Award for Best Picture Made for Television (nominated)
 C.A.S. Award for Outstanding Sound Mixing for Television – MOW's and Mini-Series (nominated)
 Golden Reel Award for Best Sound Editing in Television Long Form – Music (nominated)
 Primetime Emmy Award for Outstanding Music Composition for a Miniseries, Movie, or Special (Dramatic Underscore) (nominated)
 Screen Actors Guild Award for Outstanding Performance by a Male Actor in a Television Movie or Miniseries - Sean Hayes (nominated)

See also
 Martin and Lewis

External links

Official site at CBS (via internet archive)
CBS press release for encore broadcast July 24, 2005 (The Futon Critic)
 Gallo, Phil, "Martin and Lewis"; Variety, November 19, 2002
 Eslinger, Amy, Interview with John Gray; OnSat Magazine, October 9, 2002
Adalian, Jose, Storyline picks Brit for its Dino; Variety, June 5, 2002

2002 television films
2002 films
2000s biographical films
American biographical films
CBS network films
Jerry Lewis
Films directed by John Gray (director)
Films set in the 1940s
Films set in the 1950s
Films shot in Toronto
Biographical films about musicians
2000s American films